Edith Thacher Hurd (September 14, 1910 – January 25, 1997) was an American writer of children's books. She published 70 books in her lifetime, fifty of them illustrated by her husband, Clement Hurd.

Biography
Edith Thacher was born in Kansas City, Missouri, in 1910 to John Hamilton Thacher and Edith Gilman Thacher. She had one older brother, John Jr., and one younger brother, Nicholas, who served as the United States Ambassador to Saudi Arabia from 1970 to 1973.

She attended Radcliffe College and the Bank Street College of Education, where she first met Clement Hurd and Margaret Wise Brown. She taught for four years at New York's Dalton School, and during World War II worked as a news analyst at the United States Office of War Information in San Francisco. Thacher and Hurd married in 1939, collaborated on over fifty books, and had a son, John Thacher Hurd. Hurd also co-wrote with Brown, under the pseudonym "Juniper Sage."

She died on January 25, 1997, in Walnut Creek, California, aged 86.

Hurd's work, as well as that of her husband and son, was featured at several museums in the traveling exhibition "From Goodnight Moon to Art Dog: The World of Clement, Edith and Thacher Hurd."

Selected works 
 
 Hurry Hurry illus. Mary Pepperrell Dana (W. R. Scott, 1938)
 The Wreck of the Wild Wave: Being the True Account of the Wreck of the Clipper Ship Wild Wave of Boston illus. Josiah Nickerson Knowles (Oxford University Press, 1942)
 Jerry the Jeep illus. Theodore Friday (Lothrop, 1945)
 The Galleon from Manila (Oxford University Press, 1949)
 Mr. Shortsleeves' Great Big Store illus. Bernice Myers (Simon & Schuster, 1952)
 The Golden Hind, illus. Leonard Everett Fisher (Crowell, 1960)
 Sandpipers illus. Lucienne Bloch (Crowell, 1961)
 Starfish illus. Lucienne Bloch (Crowell, 1962)
 Sailers, Whalers and Steamers: Ships that Opened the West illus. Lyle Galloway (Lane, 1964)
 Who Will Be Mine? illus. by photographs (Golden Gate, 1966)
 The White Horse  illus. Tony Chen (Harper, 1970)
 Come With Me to Nursery School illus. Edward Bigelow (Coward, 1970)
 Dinosaur, My Darling illus. by Don Freeman (Harper & Row, 1978)
 The Black Dog Who Went into the Woods illus. Emily Arnold McCully (Harper, 1980)
 I Dance in My Red Pajamas illus. Emily Arnold McCully (Harper, 1982)
  Song of the Sea Otter illus. Jennifer Dewey (Pantheon, 1983)

with Margaret Wise Brown 
 The Man in the Manhole and the Fix-It Men, illus. Bill Ballantine (New York: W. R. Scott, 1946), written as "Juniper Sage", OCLC 1698467
 Five Little Firemen, illus. Tibor Gergely (Little Golden Books, 1948)
 The Little Fat Policeman, illus. Alice and Martin Provensen (Little Golden Books, 1950)

Illustrated by Clement Hurd 
 Benny the Bulldozer (Lothrop, Lee & Shepard Co., 1947)
 Caboose (Lothrop, Lee & Shepard Co., 1950)
 Little Brass Band (Harper, 1955)
 Windy and the Willow Whistle (Sterling, 1956)
 Mr. Charlie, the Fireman's Friend (Lippincott, 1958)
 Last One Home is a Green Pig (Harper, 1959)
 Hurry Hurry (Harper, 1960) — re-issue of a book published in 1938 by W. R. Scott with illustrations by Mary Pepperrell Dana
 Come and Have Fun (Harper, 1962)
 Christmas Eve (Harper, 1962)
 No Funny Business (Harper, 1962)
 The Day the Sun Danced (Harper, 1965)
 Johnny Lion's Book (Harper, 1965)
 What Whale? Where? (Harper, 1966)
 The Blue Heron Tree (Viking, 1968)
 This is the Forest (Coward-McCann, 1969)
 Catfish (Viking, 1970)
 Johnny Lion's Bad Day (Harper, 1970)
 Wilson's World (Harper, 1971)
 Johnny Lion's Rubber Boots (Harper, 1972)
 The Mother Owl (Little, Brown, 1974)
 The Mother Kangaroo (Little, Brown, 1976)
 Look for a Bird (Harper & Row, 1977)
 The Mother Chimpanzee (Little, Brown, 1978)
 Under the Lemon Tree (Little, Brown, 1980)

Notes

References

External links

 
 Juniper Sage (joint pseudonym) at LC Authorities, with 1 record 

1910 births
1997 deaths
Writers from Kansas City, Missouri
Radcliffe College alumni
Bank Street College of Education alumni
American children's writers
American women children's writers
20th-century American women writers
Writers from the San Francisco Bay Area
People from Walnut Creek, California
People of the United States Office of War Information